The Battle of Evarts (May 5, 1931) occurred in Harlan, Kentucky during the Harlan County Wars. The coal miners desired improved working conditions, higher wages, and more housing options for their families. These reasons, along with other factors, led the miners to go on strike. It ended when the Kentucky National Guard was called in to break it up. This battle lasted approximately 15 minutes.

Opposing forces  
Numerous forces and factors were involved in the so-called battle. Opposing the miners were the heavily armed private "police" ordered by the company to break up the strike, while other associations chose not to become involved. The United Mine Workers of America, or UMWA, considered helping the miners, but once it realized the amount of resources required, decided not to offer support. The Red Cross also decided not offer any support, saying the strike was an "industrial dispute" which did not involve them. The Black Mountain Coal Company's hired gunmen were eager to fight, and were responsible for the deaths that followed.

Battle 
The 'Battle of Evarts' began on the morning of May 5, 1931. The company had ordered a motorcade to drive to Harlan to deliver goods to the 'Scabs' (non-union miners who had been hired to replace those on strike) there. The motorcade consisted of just three cars, with a sheriff's deputy in each one. The deputies correctly expected violence, and had prepared for some sort of attack. The striking miners waited for the motorcade near the Evarts railroad, and as the motorcade approached them, a single shot rang out. No one knows who fired it, but each side blamed the other. The motorcade halted, and Deputy Jim Daniels, one of the most hated anti-union deputies in the county, jumped out and hid behind a rock. Daniels raised his head to fire at the miners, but as soon as he did so, he was fatally shot and killed. The exchange of gunfire lasted for fifteen minutes, with an estimated 1,000 shots fired. When it ended, the three deputies and one miner lay dead.

Causes 
Since this happened during the Harlan County Wars, other skirmishes had led up to the several months of turmoil. The factors that led to the Battle of Evarts included mine conditions, pay, and independence from the coal company as well as hunger, desperation, and intrigue. Miners were being laid off for attending United Mine Workers meetings. Also, the Black Mountain Coal Company created a grocery store where the miners would be able to spend the money that they earned there. Miners opposed this, as they were not allowed to spend their money elsewhere and miners who were caught spending their money elsewhere would be fired and kicked out of town. The final straw was when the Harlan County Coal Operators Association cut miners' wages by 10%. After this, the first strike occurred, in which only about 13% of strikers showed up to work. Out of all these battles, the Battle of Evarts was one of the most violent. It left four dead and had to have the Kentucky National Guard called in for protection. After months of rallies, on June 17, all mine workers reported back to their jobs.

Aftermath 
The aftermath of this battle led to wider strikes in the Harlan County area. Coal companies refused to back down while the Red Cross refused to give aid due to a policy of staying neutral during disputes. After about a month and a half of strikes, workers reported back on June 17 because of unresponsive negotiation-partners and starvation due to having no money to spend on food. Eight miners ended up receiving life in jail for conspiracy to murder for the actions that took place on May 5. The Battle of Evarts may have only been 15 minutes long with only four deaths, but played a major role in the Coal Wars.

References 

Conflicts in 1931
1931 labor disputes and strikes
Harlan County, Kentucky
1931 in Kentucky
Coal Wars
Labor disputes in Kentucky
Riots and civil disorder in Kentucky
May 1931 events